Southbank is a multi-building urban redevelopment project under construction in Chicago, being developed by Lendlease. The site was originally part of a larger development, dubbed "Riverline" built by a partnership between Chicago-based developer CMK and Lendlease but the partnership was dissolved in early 2018. Southbank neighbors the other descendant project, Riverline, which retained the original name. 

Groundbreaking occurred in 2016 when the partnership between CMK and Lendlease had not been dissolved. The development is north of The 78, another large-scale development. 

The first residential building in the complex will allow tenants to move in as early as October 2018. The building was originally known as Ancora at Riverline, but has been renamed The Cooper at Southbank.

References

Buildings and structures in Chicago
Multi-building developments in Chicago